Ken Gucker is an American Democratic Party politician formerly serving as a member of the Connecticut House of Representatives from the 138th district, which included part of the city of Danbury, as well as parts of the towns of New Fairfield and Ridgefield from 2019 to 2023. Gucker was first elected in 2018 by a two-point margin over Republican Michael Ferguson. Gucker was re-elected in 2020 by a 7-point margin over Republican Emile Buzaid. Gucker narrowly lost reelection in 2022 to Danbury Board of Education member Rachel Chaleski by a margin of 26 votes.

References

Living people
Democratic Party members of the Connecticut House of Representatives
People from Danbury, Connecticut
21st-century American politicians
Year of birth missing (living people)